The 2007 Shepherd Rams football team represented Shepherd University during the 2007 NCAA Division II football season as a member of the West Virginia Intercollegiate Athletic Conference. They were led by head coach Monte Cater, in his 21st season as head coach, and finished the season 102. With a conference record of 71, they were the WVIAC champions and advanced to the Division II Playoffs, losing in the quarterfinals at California (PA). The Rams played their home games at Ram Stadium in Shepherdstown, West Virginia.

Regular season
The 2007 regular season for the Rams consisted of eight games against WVIAC opponents, and one game each against Shippensburg and Millersville. The Rams went 91 in the regular season and advanced to the 2007 NCAA Division II football playoffs as the number two seed in Super Region 4.

With their 427 victory over West Virginia State, the Rams won their fourth straight WVIAC Championship.

Playoffs
The Rams won their first playoff game, a second round game at home against IUP, after receiving a bye in the first round. The team then went on to lose their quarterfinal game, 5838 against California (PA).

Schedule

References

Shepherd
Shepherd Rams football seasons
Shepherd Rams football